The Ponds may refer to:

 The Ponds, New South Wales, a suburb of Sydney, Australia
 The Ponds, New Jersey, United States, a census-designated place

See also
 The Pond (disambiguation)
 Pond (disambiguation)